Kaskian (Kaskean) was the language of the Kaskians (Kaska) of northeastern Bronze Age Anatolia in the mountains along the Black Sea coast. The Encyclopedia of Indo-European Culture lists the Kaskians as non–Indo-European. There are a number of theories regarding to which language family the Kaskian language belonged.

It is sometimes suspected that Kaskian was related to the pre-Hittite Hattic language, based on toponyms and personal names; the Hattic moon god was named Kasku. Conversely, the Kaskian language may have been an Indo-European language, perhaps related to Thraco-Phrygian. There may also be connections to the Northwest Caucasian languages; the name Kaskian may be cognate with an old name for Circassia, and the name of one of the tribes in the Kaskian confederation, the Abešla, may be cognate with the endonym of the Abkhaz people and some Circassian people, suggesting the Kaskians proper and Abešla might have been the ancestors of the Circassians and other Caucasian peoples.  It has been conjectured that Kaskian might belong to the Zan family of languages, and have affinities to Megrelian or Laz.

References

Languages of ancient Anatolia
Unclassified languages of Asia